When Hell Was in Session is a memoir by U.S. Navy Rear Admiral Jeremiah Denton, recounting his experiences as an American prisoner of war (POW) during the Vietnam War. A Navy pilot, Denton's jet was shot down over North Vietnam in July 1965. Denton and his navigator, Bill Tschudy, parachuted down and were soon taken prisoner. Both men spent seven years and seven months in North Vietnam as often-tortured POWs. In 1979, the book was made into a television movie starring Hal Holbrook. It was adapted by screenwriter Jake Justiz, also known as Lee Pogostin.

Denton, James Stockdale (who graduated with Denton at the Naval Academy), Larry Guarino, and James Robinson Risner, distinguished themselves as members of the American POW resistance movement from 1965 to 1973, helping POWs accomplish their sworn goal to "return with honor". Return with Honor was later used as the title of a documentary film released in 2000 about American POWs during the Vietnam War, narrated and produced by actor Tom Hanks.

External links
Denton, Jeremiah (1976). When Hell Was in Session. Reader's Digest Press. .

1976 non-fiction books
Military autobiographies
Vietnam War books
Memoirs of imprisonment